Dayville is a city along U.S. Route 26 in Grant County, in the U.S. state of Oregon. It was incorporated in 1913. The population was 149 at the 2010 census.

History
Dayville was named for the John Day River. In the mid-19th century, Dayville was along the route of a wagon road, renamed The Dalles Military Road in about 1870, that connected The Dalles on the Columbia River with gold mines near Canyon City. Dayville was incorporated in 1913.

Geography
U.S. Route 26 runs east–west through Dayville, and South Fork Road, which runs north–south along the smaller river, meets the larger highway in the city. Murderers Creek State Wildlife Area, the Aldrich Mountains, and parts of the Malheur National Forest are slightly southeast of Dayville. Slightly southwest are the Black Canyon Wilderness, the Ochoco Mountains, and parts of the Ochoco National Forest.

Climate

Demographics

2010 census
As of the census of 2010, there were 149 people, 72 households, and 41 families residing in the town. The racial makeup of the town was 96.0% White, 3.4% Native American, and 0.7% from two or more races. Hispanic or Latino of any race were 0.7% of the population.

There were 72 households, out of which 19.4% had children under the age of 18 living with them, 47.2% were married couples living together, 9.7% had a female householder with no husband present, and 43.1% were non-families. 38.9% of all households were made up of individuals, and 15.2% had someone living alone who was 65 years of age or older. The average household size was 2.07 and the average family size was 2.68.

The median age in the town was 50.8 years. 14.8% of residents were under the age of 18; 8.1% were between the ages of 18 and 24; 16.1% were from 25 to 44; 38.3% were from 45 to 64; and 22.8% were 65 years of age or older. The gender makeup of the town was 53.7% male and 46.3% female.

2000 census
As of the census of 2000, there were 138 people, 59 households, and 36 families residing in the city. The population density was 269.5 people per square mile (104.5/km2). There were 77 housing units at an average density of 150.4 per square mile (58.3/km2). The racial makeup of the city was 96.38% White, 2.17% Native American, 0.72% Asian, and 0.72% from two or more races.

There were 59 households, out of which 27.1% had children under the age of 18 living with them, 49.2% were married couples living together, 11.9% had a female householder with no husband present, and 37.3% were non-families. 32.2% of all households were made up of individuals, and 10.2% had someone living alone who was 65 years of age or older. The average household size was 2.34 and the average family size was 3.05.

In the city, the population was spread out, with 24.6% under the age of 18, 5.8% from 18 to 24, 24.6% from 25 to 44, 23.9% from 45 to 64, and 21.0% who were 65 years of age or older. The median age was 42 years. For every 100 females, there were 89.0 males. For every 100 females age 18 and over, there were 96.2 males.

The median income for a household in the city was $30,893, and the median income for a family was $33,438. Males had a median income of $27,083 versus $25,417 for females. The per capita income for the city was $18,319. There were 12.2% of families and 16.1% of the population living below the poverty line, including 26.5% of under eighteens and none of those over 64.

Economy
Dayville is home to Dayville School District, a K−12 system with a total of about 50 students in 2007. As of 2002, the five largest employers in Dayville were the school district, the Dayville Merc (groceries), a cafe, a lounge, and a gas station.

The Dayville Presbyterian Church has since the 1970s offered hospitality to bicyclists journeying along the TransAmerica bicycle trail.

References

External links

Entry for Dayville in the Oregon Blue Book
Dayville page at Grant County Chamber of Commerce

Cities in Oregon
Cities in Grant County, Oregon
1913 establishments in Oregon